Gananoque is a town in Ontario, Canada.

It can also refer to the following items related to the town:
 Gananoque River, a river with its mouth at the town of Gananoque
 Gananoque Lake, a lake of eastern Ontario, Canada
 Gananoque Islanders, a Canadian Junior "C" ice hockey based in Gananoque
 Gananoque Airport
 Gananoque railway station
 Gananoque & Rideau Railway, historic railway also known as Thousand Islands Railway

Ships named after the town
 Gananoque (ship), a clipper ship of 1857
 HMCS Gananoque (J259), Bangor-class minesweeper, a Canadian warship